Nedd4 family interacting protein 1 is a protein that in humans is encoded by the NDFIP1 gene.

Function

The protein encoded by this gene belongs to a small group of evolutionarily conserved proteins with three transmembrane domains. It is a potential target for ubiquitination by the Nedd4 family of proteins. This protein is thought to be part of a family of integral Golgi membrane proteins. [provided by RefSeq, Jul 2008].

References

Further reading